Michael William McMahon Jr. (August 30, 1941 – April 29, 2013) was a Canadian ice hockey defenceman who played in the National Hockey League (NHL) for the New York Rangers, Minnesota North Stars, Chicago Black Hawks, Detroit Red Wings, Pittsburgh Penguins and the Buffalo Sabres between 1963 and 1972. He also played in the World Hockey Association for the Minnesota Fighting Saints and San Diego Mariners between 1972 and 1976. He played 224 games in the NHL, scoring 15 goals and 83 points, and 269 games in the WHA, scoring 29 goals and 130 points.  His father, Mike Sr. also played in the NHL. McMahon was born in Quebec City, Quebec.

He died in Saint Paul, Minnesota on April 29, 2013.

Career statistics

Regular season and playoffs

References

External links
 

1941 births
2013 deaths
Anglophone Quebec people
Baltimore Clippers players
Buffalo Sabres players
Canadian ice hockey defencemen
Canadian people of Irish descent
Chicago Blackhawks players
Cleveland Barons (1937–1973) players
Detroit Red Wings players
Guelph Royals players
Ice hockey people from Quebec City
Kitchener Beavers (EPHL) players
Minnesota Fighting Saints players
Minnesota North Stars players
Minnesota Rangers players
New York Rangers players
Pittsburgh Penguins players
Providence Reds players
Quebec Aces (AHL) players
Rochester Americans players
San Diego Mariners players
Springfield Indians players
Springfield Kings players
St. Paul Rangers players
Sudbury Wolves (EPHL) players